Donnadieu is a surname. Notable people with the surname include:

 Bernard-Pierre Donnadieu (1949–2010), French actor
 Marguerite Donnadieu, better known as Marguerite Duras (1914–1996), French writer